Guv'ner was an American alternative rock band from New York City, formed in 1993 following a relationship between members Charles Gansa and Pumpkin Wentzel. Thurston Moore of Sonic Youth discovered the band when he was handed a demo of theirs by Julia Cafritz of Pussy Galore, who had known Wentzel since school. Moore put out Guv'ner's debut album Hard for Measy for You on his label, Ecstatic Peace.

Further albums – The Hunt and Spectral Worship – were released on Merge Records in 1996 and 1998 respectively. The drummer, Danny Tunick, joined after the debut album. On Hard For Measy For You, drumming duties were shared by Brian Logan and Jamie Lawrence.

Discography

Albums

Singles/EPs

Split singles

Compilation appearances

References

External links
 Guv'ner Official Profile on MySpace Music

Indie rock musical groups from New York (state)
Musical groups from New York City
Merge Records artists
Ecstatic Peace! artists